Farid Boulaya (born 25 February 1993) is an Algerian professional footballer who plays as an attacking midfielder for Qatari club Al-Gharafa and the Algeria national team.

Club career
An Istres youth graduate, Boulaya made his professional debut on 11 May 2012, coming on as a substitute for Maxime Tarasconi in a 1–0 defeat away at Lens.

On 31 August 2016, Boulaya signed a four-year deal for Ligue 1 side Bastia. However, he only appeared in two matches for the club.

On 25 July 2017, Boulaya moved abroad for the first time in his career, after agreeing to a three-year deal with La Liga side Girona. In January 2018, he joined Metz on loan.

On 21 August 2022, Boulaya signed a two-year contract with Al-Gharafa in Qatar.

International career
Boulaya made his debut with the Algeria national team in a 1–0 friendly win over Nigeria on 9 October 2020.

References

External links
Farid Boulaya career statistics at foot-national.com

1993 births
Sportspeople from Bouches-du-Rhône
Footballers from Provence-Alpes-Côte d'Azur
Living people
Algerian footballers
Algeria international footballers
French footballers
French sportspeople of Algerian descent
Association football midfielders
FC Istres players
Clermont Foot players
SC Bastia players
Girona FC players
FC Metz players
Al-Gharafa SC players
Ligue 1 players
Championnat National 2 players
Ligue 2 players
Championnat National players
Championnat National 3 players
2021 Africa Cup of Nations players
Algerian expatriate footballers
French expatriate footballers
French expatriate sportspeople in Spain
Algerian expatriate sportspeople in Spain
Expatriate footballers in Spain
French expatriate sportspeople in Qatar
Algerian expatriate sportspeople in Qatar
Expatriate footballers in Qatar